Server Ibragimov is an Uzbekistani sport shooter. He represented Uzbekistan at the 2016 Summer Paralympics held in Rio de Janeiro, Brazil and he won the bronze medal in the men's 10 metre air pistol SH1 event. He qualified to represent Uzbekistan at the 2020 Summer Paralympics in Tokyo, Japan after winning the silver medal at the 2018 World Shooting Para Sport Championships held in Cheongju, South Korea.

References

External links 
 

Living people
Year of birth missing (living people)
Place of birth missing (living people)
Uzbekistani male sport shooters
Paralympic shooters of Uzbekistan
Shooters at the 2016 Summer Paralympics
Shooters at the 2020 Summer Paralympics
Medalists at the 2016 Summer Paralympics
Paralympic bronze medalists for Uzbekistan
Paralympic medalists in shooting
21st-century Uzbekistani people